Stanley Joseph Wudyka (March 13, 1910 – January 25, 2003) was an American long-distance runner. He competed in the men's 10,000 metres at the 1936 Summer Olympics.

References

External links

1910 births
2003 deaths
Athletes (track and field) at the 1936 Summer Olympics
American male long-distance runners
Olympic track and field athletes of the United States
Track and field athletes from Philadelphia